Dennis Jonsson (born 30 November 1991) is a former speedway rider from Sweden.

Speedway career
He rode in the top tier of British Speedway riding for the Lakeside Hammers in the 2016 Elite League. He retired from speedway following a serious accident when riding for Marsana in Sweden.

Family
He is the son of Per Jonsson, the 1990 World Champion.

References 

1991 births
Living people
Swedish speedway riders
Lakeside Hammers riders
Sportspeople from Stockholm